Harleston is a village in Devon, England.

References
 

Villages in Devon